Boris Franz Becker (born 22 November 1967) is a German former world No. 1 tennis player. Becker is the youngest ever winner of the gentlemen's singles Wimbledon Championships title at the age of 17 in 1985. Becker is regarded as one of the greatest Tennis players of all time and was featured in the list of Tennis magazine's 40 greatest players on its 40th anniversary in 2006. He won 64 titles overall including an Olympic gold medal. Becker won 49 singles and 15 doubles titles including six Grand Slam singles titles: three Wimbledon Championships, two Australian Opens and one US Open, 13 Masters titles, three year-end championships and leading Germany to back-to-back championship wins in Davis Cup 1988 and 1989. 

Becker is often credited as the pioneer of power tennis with his lightning fast serve and explosive all-court game featuring flying through the air volleys, acrobatic dives, rolls and crushing service returns. He is also among the Top 10 players with the best ATP win percentages in the history of the game. 

In 1989, he was voted the Player of the Year by both the ATP and the ITF. Becker is arguably the greatest Davis cup singles player with a win percentage of 92.70%, a win loss record of 38-3 and two championship wins for Germany.  In his autobiography, Andre Agassi mentioned that Becker was the world's most popular tennis star while recalling the events of a match he played against Becker in late 1980s.
 
After his playing career ended Becker became a tennis commentator and media personality, his personal relationships were discussed in news outlets. He has engaged in numerous ventures, including coaching Novak Djokovic for three years, playing poker professionally and working for an online poker company. In October 2002, the Munich District Court gave Becker a suspended two-year prison sentence for tax evasion. He declared bankruptcy in the UK in 2017. In April 2022, he was sentenced by UK courts to two and a half years in prison for hiding assets and loans that the court required him to disclose to creditors and the bankruptcy trustee. On 15 December, he was released from prison early, having served eight months, and was immediately deported to Germany by UK authorities.

Early life

Boris Becker was born in Leimen, a town in the German state of Baden-Württemberg, the son of Elvira and Karl-Heinz Becker. Named after the Russian poet and novelist Boris Pasternak, young Becker was raised Catholic. His father Karl-Heinz, an architect, founded a tennis centre in Leimen, where Becker learned to play tennis. He received his secondary education at Helmholtz-Gymnasium in Heidelberg. His Sudeten German mother Elvira Becker, née Pisch was from the Moravian village of Kunewald (Kunín).

Tennis career

In 1974, Becker joined TC Blau-Weiß Leimen tennis club and began training under Boris Breskvar. By 1977, he was a member of the junior team of the Baden Tennis Association. He went on to win the South German championship and the first German Youth Tennis Tournament.

In 1978, he was chosen for the German Tennis Federation's top junior team by Richard Schönborn. According to Schönborn, the funding for Becker's training was put up by the German Tennis Federation at an expense of over 1.3 million DM. In 1981, he was included in the Federation's first men's team. In 1982, he won the doubles at the Orange Bowl International Tennis Championships.

Becker turned professional in 1984, under the guidance of Romanian-born coach Günther Bosch and Romanian manager Ion Ţiriac, and won his first professional doubles title that year in Munich. As a teenager, Becker won the Tennis World Young Masters at the NEC in Birmingham in 1985, before taking his first top-level singles title in June that year at Queen's Club. Two weeks later, on 7 July, he became the first unseeded player and the first German to win the Wimbledon singles title, defeating Kevin Curren in four sets. Becker was at that time ranked 20th in ATP ranking, and was unseeded, as at that time Wimbledon did not seed players beyond the top 16. Two months after his triumph, Becker became the youngest winner of the Cincinnati Open. Becker has since said that "the plan from my parents for me was to finish school, go to university, get a proper degree and learn something respectful. The last thing on everyone's mind was me becoming a tennis professional."

In 1986, Becker successfully defended his Wimbledon title, defeating No. 1 Ivan Lendl in straight sets in the final. In 1987 Becker, then ranked 2, lost in the second round of Wimbledon to Peter Doohan, ranked 70. In the Davis Cup that year, Becker and John McEnroe played one of the longest matches in tennis history. Becker won 4–6, 15–13, 8–10, 6–2, 6–2 (at that time, there were no tiebreaks in the Davis Cup). The match lasted 6 hours and 22 minutes.

Becker contested the Wimbledon final in 1988, where he lost in four sets to Stefan Edberg in a match that marked the start of one of Wimbledon's great rivalries. Becker also helped West Germany win its first Davis Cup in 1988. He won the year-end Masters title in New York City, defeating five-time champion Lendl in the final. The same year he also won season ending WCT Finals for the rival World Championship Tennis tour, defeating Edberg in four sets.

In 1989, Becker won two Grand Slam singles titles, the only year he won more than one. After losing to Edberg in the French Open semifinals, he defeated Edberg in the Wimbledon final, and then beat Lendl in the US Open final. He also helped West Germany retain the Davis Cup, defeating Andre Agassi in the semifinal round. As a result, Becker was named Player of The Year by the ATP Tour.

In 1990, Becker met Edberg for the third consecutive year in the Wimbledon final, but this time lost in a long five-set match. He failed to successfully defend his US Open title, losing to Agassi in the semifinals. Becker reached the final of the Australian Open for the first time in his career in 1991, where he defeated Lendl to claim the No. 1 ranking. Another loss to Agassi in the French Open semifinals kept him from winning the first two Grand Slam tournaments of the year. He was ranked No. 1 for 12 weeks during 1991 and reached his fourth consecutive Wimbledon final. However, he lost in straight sets to fellow German and No. 7 Michael Stich. Becker and Stich developed a fierce rivalry, however, Becker and Stich teamed up in 1992 to win the men's doubles gold medal at the Olympic Games in Barcelona.

In 1992, Becker won seven tour titles including his second ATP Tour World Championships defeating Jim Courier in four sets.

By 1993, issues back home over his courtship of and marriage to Barbara Feltus, whose mother was German and father was African-American, and tax problems with the German government, had caused Becker to slide into a severe mid-career decline.

By 1995 Becker had been in continual decline for half a decade due to losing interest in Tennis and off-court reasons. That year he reached the Wimbledon final for the seventh time, defeating Agassi in the semifinals. In the final, however, Becker, further fatigued after gruelling baseline contests with Cédric Pioline and then with Agassi, lost in four sets to Pete Sampras. He won the year-end ATP Tour World Championships for the third and last time in Frankfurt with a straight-set win over Michael Chang in the final. Becker's sixth and final Grand Slam title came in 1996 when he defeated Chang in the final of the Australian Open. After winning the Queen's Club Championships for the fourth time, Becker was widely expected to mount a serious challenge for the Wimbledon title in 1996, but his bid ended abruptly when he damaged his right wrist during a third-round match against Neville Godwin and was forced to withdraw.

Becker defeated Sampras in October 1996 in a five-set final in Stuttgart Masters. "Becker is the best indoor player I've ever played", said Sampras after the match. Becker lost to Sampras in the final of the 1996 ATP Tour World Championships in Hanover. Becker saved two match points in the fourth set and held serve 27 consecutive times until he was broken in the penultimate game. Later that year he won the Grand Slam Cup defeating Goran Ivanišević in the final. In 1997, Becker lost to Sampras in the quarterfinals at Wimbledon. After that match, he vowed that he would never play at Wimbledon again. However, Becker played Wimbledon one more time in 1999, this time losing in the fourth round to Patrick Rafter.

Becker was most comfortable playing on fast-playing surfaces, particularly grass courts and indoor carpet (on which he won 26 titles). He reached a few finals playing on clay courts, but never won a clay-court tournament in his professional career. His best performances at the French Open were when he reached the semifinals in 1987, 1989, and 1991. Becker was close to winning a clay-court tournament in his last final on the surface, when he led Thomas Muster by two sets to love in the 1995 Monte Carlo Open final, and double-faulted on set point in the fourth-set tiebreaker.

Over the course of his career, Becker won 49 singles titles and 15 doubles titles. Besides his six Grand Slam titles, he was also a singles winner in the year-end Masters / ATP Tour World Championships in 1988, 1992, and 1995, the WCT Finals in 1988 and at the Grand Slam Cup in 1996. He won a record-equalling four singles titles at London's Queen's Club. In Davis Cup, his career win–loss record was 54–12, including 38–3 in singles. He also won the other two major international team titles playing for Germany, the Hopman Cup (in 1995) and the World Team Cup (in 1989 and 1998). He is the first male player to appear in 7 Wimbledon finals in the Modern Era, tied with Sampras and Djokovic, and behind the record 12 Wimbledon finals appearances by Federer.

Becker won singles titles in 14 countries: Australia, Austria, Belgium, Canada, France, Germany, Italy, Japan, Netherlands, Qatar, Sweden, Switzerland, United Kingdom, United States. In 2003, he was inducted into the International Tennis Hall of Fame. He occasionally plays on the senior tour and in World Team Tennis. He has also worked as a commentator at Wimbledon for the BBC.

Playing style

Becker's game was based on a fast and well-placed serve, that earned him the nicknames "Boom Boom", "Der Bomber" and "Baron von Slam", and great volleying skills at the net. He could supplement his pure serve-and-volley game with brilliant athleticism at the net, which included the diving volley that was considered a trademark of the young German, and which endeared him to his fans. The signature dives and rolls were never seen before Becker came to the scene, and the 'Becker dive' and 'Becker roll' became crowd pullers wherever Becker played. His heavy forehand and return of serve were also very significant factors in his game.

Becker occasionally deviated from his serve-and-volley style to try to out-hit, from the baseline, opponents who normally were at their best while remaining near the baseline. Even though Becker possessed powerful shots from both wings, this strategy was often criticized by commentators.

Becker had frequent emotional outbursts on court. Whenever he considered himself to be playing badly, he often swore at himself and occasionally smashed his rackets. In 1987, he was fined $2000 following a series of outbursts during the Australian Open in Melbourne, including breaking three rackets, "twice throwing the ball in an offensive manner at the umpire, hitting the umpire's chair on one occasion, spitting water in the direction of the umpire, and hitting three balls out of the court." Becker's highly dramatic play spawned new expressions such as the Becker Blocker (his trademark early return shot), the Becker Hecht (a flying lunge), the Becker Faust ("Becker Fist"), the Becker Shuffle (the dance he sometimes performed after making important points), and Becker Säge ("Becker Saw" – referring to the way in which he pumped his fists in a sawing motion).

Becker, one of the most effective players in his era on grass courts and carpet courts, had less success on clay. He never won a top-level singles title on clay, coming closest when holding two match points against Thomas Muster in the final of the 1995 Monte Carlo Open. Becker did, however, team up with Michael Stich to win the 1992 men's doubles Olympic gold medal on clay.

Career statistics

Singles performance timeline

Records
 These records were attained in Open Era of tennis.
 Records in bold indicate peer-less achievements.
 ^ Denotes consecutive streak.

Place in history
Tennis magazine ranked Becker the 11th best male player of the 1965–2005 period.

Professional awards
 ITF World Champion: 1989.
 ATP Player of the Year: 1989.
 ATP Most Improved Player: 1985.

Post-retirement

In 2012, Becker described his approach to retirement. "I had won so much by 22, a number of Wimbledon titles, US Open, Davis Cup, World number one. You look for the next big thing and that isn't in tennis."

Tax evasion conviction
Becker was found guilty by the Munich District Court of deliberately making false statements regarding his place of residence on his personal income tax filings in order to save DM3.3 million.

A criminal investigation into his tax affairs began in December 1996 while he was still an active professional tennis player. By the time German prosecutors filed charges of tax evasion against the tennis star in July 2002, Becker had already retired from the sport. The retired tennis player, who had earned over US$25 million in prize money plus millions in endorsements, was originally charged with withholding taxes of DM10.4 million (US$5 million), however, the trial ended up being for the considerably lower sum of DM3.3 million (€1.6 million) for which prosecutors believed they had evidence. Throughout late summer and early fall 2002, leading up to the publicized trial that was to focus on where Becker lived between 1991 and 1993 (his tax filings claimed Monaco while the prosecution had evidence of the player in fact spending majority of that time in the Munich area), most observers predicted the star would make a deal with the Munich public prosecutor's office—admitting guilt in exchange for a lighter sentence.

As predicted, at his day in court on 23 October 2002, 34-year-old Becker admitted to living in Munich between 1991 and 1993 despite being officially registered in Monaco, however, maintaining he could not be accused of withholding income or engaging in criminal machinations. At the same time, as part of his defence, Becker emphasized that his property where he stayed in Munich was not a standard apartment but a "spartan flat with just a bed and no refrigerator". It also came out that he had been warned against purchasing the Munich apartment, but ignored the warnings. The player also told the court that the financial investigations that had begun in December 1996 played a role in his decision to retire from tennis due to "countless raids of [his] house and office" and that he "hasn't won any tournaments since then and ended [his] career".

Simultaneously with Becker's testimony, his lawyer presented the court with evidence that a week prior to his court date, Becker had paid around €3 million in back taxes, far exceeding the DM3.3 million (€1.6 million) amount he was in the dock for. Despite the admission, as well as the payment, both seen as part of an attempt to settle the six-year process with a lighter sentence, the prosecution still asked the court for a sentence of three years and six months in jail.

One day later, on 24 October 2002, in a courtroom with public gallery packed with Becker's fans, the Munich District Court judge Huberta Knöringer gave Becker a two-year prison sentence, the execution of which was suspended. Additionally, his sentence included a fine of €300,000 and another €200,000 to various charitable institutions.

Investments
Since 2000, Becker has been the principal owner of the tennis division of Völkl Inc., a tennis racquet and clothing manufacturer.

Also in 2000, Becker partnered up with the German IT company Pixelpark AG for a joint dot-com investment: Sportgate.de, a German-language website covering local, regional and national sporting scene in Germany. The venture shut down during summer 2001, less than a year into its operation, amid reports of Becker's business partner, Pixelpark's CEO Paulus Neef who owned a 35% stake in Sportgate, failing to come up with a promised £1m cash injection. Paulus countered with a lawsuit against Becker in the Munich regional court for feeling "conned".

Becker's autobiography, Augenblick, verweile doch... (en: The Player) was published in 2003. Its release made global headlines due to the tennis star's divulgence of details surrounding his publicized divorce from Barbara Feltus, including an account of his 1999 sexual encounter with the Russian waitress Angela Ermakova that triggered the eventual end of his marriage to Feltus. Other personal disclosures in the book include revelations of addiction to painkillers and sleeping pills early into his tennis playing career as well as admission about promiscuity and excessive alcoholic intake as a way of coping with loneliness while on the road. The book made The Sunday Times bestseller list.

In May 2009, Becker announced the launch of online media platform Boris Becker TV. The website, in English and German, features clips from his career and footage of his daily life.

In June 2015, prior to the Wimbledon Championship that was the 30th anniversary of his first Wimbledon win, another Becker autobiography, Boris Becker's Wimbledon: My Life and Career at the All England Club, was published with a foreword by the world's number 1 player and reigning Wimbledon champion Novak Djokovic whom Becker coached at the time.

Tennis pundit and media personality

BBC
In 2002, Becker became a commentator for the BBC at Wimbledon—a job he continued doing for the following two decades (apart from the 2014, 2015, and 2016 seasons when he coached Novak Djokovic). He moved to the United Kingdom from his native Germany in 2012, making London his primary residence. 

During BBC's coverage of the 2022 Wimbledon, which the German was absent from due to his incarceration over financial transgressions, imprisoned Becker received on-air messages of support from former broadcasting colleagues Andrew Castle, John McEnroe, and Sue Barker.

From October 2005 to June 2006, the German was a team captain on the British TV sports quiz show They Think It's All Over on BBC One. He furthermore appeared on the second episode of series 16 of the BBC's car show Top Gear as the Star in a Reasonably Priced Car.

Eurosport
From 2017, as Becker was getting back into tennis punditry on television following a 3-year stint coaching Djokovic, the German began appearing on Eurosport regularly as part of its English-language Grand Slam coverage, often alongside the network's other retired-tennis-players-turned-TV-personalities such as Mats Wilander and Barbara Schett or on his own German-language commentary show Matchball Becker alongside commentator .

In May 2022, right after Becker's sentencing to 30 months in jail and initial detention at HM Prison Wandsworth, Eurosport reportedly explored the possibility of setting up a home studio in his prison thus potentially allowing him to participate on the network's French Open coverage. Nothing came of it, however, and Eurosport eventually replaced Becker with Mischa Zverev while simultaneously renaming the Matchball Becker programme to Matchball.

Weeks after Becker's mid December 2022 release from UK jail and deportation to Germany, Eurosport announced his re-hiring ahead of their 2023 Australian Open coverage.

As of 2017, Becker is also an analyst on Fox Sports Australia's Wimbledon magazine program The Daily Serve.

Administrative work
After retiring from playing tennis, Becker has been on the economic advisory board of Bayern Munich for ten years.

On 23 August 2017, Becker was named the head of men's tennis of the German Tennis Federation (DTB).

Becker is a patron of the Elton John AIDS Foundation.

Poker
Becker is a noted poker player and has appeared in the European Poker Tour and the World Poker Tour; by 2013 he had won more than €90,000 in career earnings from poker. From November 2007 to mid-May 2013, Becker was a member of the celebrity team for the online poker platform PokerStars, where he participated in professional poker tournaments. Becker made his first appearance as a poker amateur at a tournament in Monte Carlo in April 2008. In mid-April, he entered the Main Event of the World Poker Tour at the Bellagio and finished the tournament in 40th place, winning more than $40,000 in prize money. In August 2011, he came 97th at the European Poker Tour in Barcelona, winning €8,000. In April 2013 he again took part in the EPT Main Event, this time in Berlin, coming 49th with a win of €15,000. As of August 2018, Becker has made tournament earnings of over $100,000 and was ranked 132,133rd in the Global Poker Index. He has become an ambassador for the partypoker online poker platform, playing under the nickname Boris__Becker.

Coaching Novak Djokovic
In December 2013, Novak Djokovic announced on his website that Boris Becker would become his head coach for the 2014 season. As a result, Becker gave up his commentating job with the BBC. In December 2016, Djokovic and Becker parted ways. Over the three seasons they worked together, Becker contributed to Djokovic's six Grand Slam titles and 14 Masters 1000 titles. Djokovic also won the French Open in 2016 – the only Grand Slam singles title which Becker never won himself.

Bankruptcy
On 21 June 2017, Becker was declared bankrupt by the Bankruptcy and Companies Court in London. The order arose when a 2015 debt—centered around an unpaid loan on Becker's estate in Mallorca, Spain—owed to private bank Arbuthnot Latham for nearly $14 million was not paid in full before an assigned deadline, and there was no realistic expectation that it would be paid. Becker denied to the Neue Zürcher Zeitung that he was "broke" or that he owed former business adviser Hans-Dieter Cleven any money; Cleven filed suit in a Switzerland court claiming he was owed $41 million.

In June 2018, Becker's lawyers claimed their client had diplomatic immunity in the bankruptcy case owing to his appointment as the Central African Republic's (CAR) "Attaché for Sports/Humanitarian/Cultural Affairs in the European Union". Charles-Armel Doubane, the CAR's Foreign Minister, countered that Becker was "not an official diplomat for the Central African Republic", that the role of attaché for sports "does not exist", and that the CAR passport produced by Becker was one of a batch that had been stolen in 2014. In September 2019, the German businessman Stephan Welk who provided the passport was detained for possible fraud.

On 21 May 2019, Smith & Williamson announced that it had instructed its agent Wyles Hardy to auction Becker's trophies and memorabilia on 11 July 2019. On 24 June 2019, it was reported that Becker was forced to auction off 82 collectables from his personal collection, including a Goldene Kamera award and his trophy from the 1989 US Open, in order to pay creditors. On 11 July 2019, an online auction was held of Becker's memorabilia, raising £687,000, according to the company dealing with his bankruptcy.

On 5 November 2019, the bankruptcy restrictions were extended for an additional 12 years, until 16 October 2031, after Becker was judged to have been hiding assets and transactions worth over £4.5 million.

Imprisonment
Becker was charged with illegally failing to hand over assets and trophies with a value of £2.5 million to repay debt during his bankruptcy, and on 21 March 2022, his trial began at Southwark Crown Court, London. On 8 April 2022, Becker was found guilty of four charges under the Insolvency Act. On 29 April 2022, he was sentenced to 30 months imprisonment for the offences. His incarceration commenced at HM Prison Wandsworth within the London Borough of Wandsworth before he was transferred to HM Prison Huntercombe, a facility used to detain foreign criminals. Becker was released from prison on 15 December 2022 having served 8 months. The same day he took a private jet to Germany, as he was eligible for automatic deportation having received a custodial sentence of more than 12 months.

Documentary
Becker is the subject of a two-part 2023 Alex Gibney documentary Boom! Boom! The World Vs Boris Becker, the first part of which premiered at the 2023 Berlin Film Festival.

Personal life
The Guardian reported in 2009 that in addition to properties in Munich, Monaco and Schwyz, Becker had an apartment in Wimbledon, and possibly still maintained a residence in Miami, to be near his children. As of 2017, Becker lived in Wimbledon, within walking distance of the championship grounds.

Relationships

After a relationship from 1988 to 1991 with Karen Schultz, and from 1991 to 1992 with Cassandra Hepburn, he began a relationship with Barbara Feltus, whom he married on 17 December 1993, when she was eight months pregnant, at the registry office of his hometown of Leimen. Before the marriage, they shocked some in Germany by posing nude for the cover of Stern in a picture taken by her father.

On 18 January 1994, their son Noah Gabriel, named after Becker's friends Yannick Noah and Peter Gabriel, was born. Their second child, Elias Balthasar, was born on 4 September 1999.

After Becker asked Barbara for a separation in December 2000, she flew to Miami, Florida, U.S.A., with Noah and Elias and filed a divorce petition in Miami-Dade County Court, sidestepping their prenuptial agreement which had entitled her to a single $2.5 million payoff. Barbara left for Florida after being contacted by a woman claiming to be pregnant with Becker's child. In his autobiography, Becker stated that he admitted to his wife that he had had a one-night stand with another woman while Barbara was pregnant with their second child. He wrote that Barbara struck him during an argument after he flew to Florida to meet her and discuss the break up of their marriage. The pretrial hearing in January 2001 was broadcast live to Germany. The couple had dinner together every night during the hearing. Becker was granted a divorce on 15 January 2001: Barbara received a $14.4 million settlement, their condominium on Fisher Island, Florida, and custody of their children.

In February 2001, Becker acknowledged paternity of a daughter, Anna, with Russian waitress Angela Ermakova, after media reported that he had a child as a result of a sexual encounter in 1999. The episode allegedly took place at London's Nobu restaurant.  Becker initially denied paternity, claiming he only had oral sex with Ermakova. His lawyers claimed that Ermakova had stolen his sperm and used it to inseminate herself after the encounter. Subsequently, he reversed his stance and accepted fatherhood. Some time after that, a DNA test confirmed he was the father. In November 2007, he obtained joint custody of Anna after expressing concerns over how Ermakova was raising her.

Her father, Axel Meyer-Wölden, was Becker's former adviser and manager. The couple broke up in November 2008.

In February 2009, Becker announced on the German TV show Wetten, dass..?, that he and Dutch model Sharlely "Lilly" Kerssenberg were to be married. The wedding took place on 12 June 2009 in St. Moritz, Switzerland. In August, they announced that they were expecting a child. Their son, Amadeus Benedict Edley Luis Becker, was born in London on 10 February 2010. 

In May 2018, Kerssenberg and Becker announced that they had separated after nine years of marriage. The announcement was followed by multiple divorce and family court hearings throughout the remainder of 2018 amid the separated spouses each accusing the other of "unreasonable behaviour" and both issuing divorce petitions. As of Becker's 2022 prison sentencing over financial transgressions, over four years since their separation, the estranged couple were still not legally divorced. Following Becker's release from prison, in a February 2023 interview for the Bild newspaper, Becker's estranged wife Kerssenberg accused the retired tennis player of not paying child support for their 13-year-old son.

In July 2019, reports appeared that Becker was dating British model Layla Powell. At the time of his 2022 conviction, he was in a relationship with Lilian de Carvalho Monteiro.

See also
 Becker–Edberg rivalry

References

Further reading

External links

 
 
 
 
 
 
 
 

1967 births
Australian Open (tennis) champions
German expatriates in Monaco
German expatriate sportspeople in Switzerland
German expatriate sportspeople in the United Kingdom
German expatriates in the United States
German poker players
German people convicted of tax crimes
German people imprisoned abroad
German male tennis players
German Roman Catholics
German tennis coaches
Hopman Cup competitors
International Tennis Hall of Fame inductees
Living people
Olympic gold medalists for Germany
Olympic medalists in tennis
Olympic tennis players of Germany
People from Leimen (Baden)
Sportspeople from Karlsruhe (region)
People from Wimbledon, London
Sports coaches from Miami
Tennis players from Miami
Tennis people from Baden-Württemberg
Tennis commentators
Tennis players at the 1992 Summer Olympics
US Open (tennis) champions
West German male tennis players
Wimbledon champions
Grand Slam (tennis) champions in men's singles
Recipients of the Silver Laurel Leaf
Medalists at the 1992 Summer Olympics
Novak Djokovic coaches
ATP number 1 ranked singles tennis players
ITF World Champions
Prisoners and detainees of England and Wales
Sportspeople convicted of crimes
Criminals from Baden-Württemberg
People convicted of making false statements